Abu Hafs al-Urduni (1973 – November 26, 2006), also transliterated as Abu Hafs al-Urdani, was a Mujahid Emir (commander)  fighting in Chechnya. He was killed in Dagestan on November 26, 2006.

Biography

Early life
Most of whatever little is known about al-Urduni, is known through the Russian media. It is however fairly certain that his given name is Farid Yusef Umeira, that he was born in Jordan and that he participated in the Soviet–Afghan War and the Tajik civil war along with Khattab and al-Walid. With the latter two he came to Chechnya in 1995 where he would remain until his death. He would also marry two Chechen women.

Chechen Wars
In the First and Second Chechen War he fought in the battalion of Chechen Mujahideen under Khattab and, after Khattab's death, as al-Walid's deputy. After al-Walid's death in 2004, al-Urduni succeeded him as Amir of the battalion and issued a video statement about al-Walid's death, much the same way as al-Walid had done with his own predecessor, Khattab. As commander of the Arab Mujahideen in Chechnya, al-Urduni faced increasingly harsh conditions for himself and his unit of foreign fighters. Apart from the loss of their most prominent commanders and the relentless hunt for separatists by the Russian Federal Forces, funding for the battalion had also become a major problem due to anti-terrorism measures restricting financial transactions. Abu Hafs orchestrated and launched the 2004 Avtury raid and the 2006 Avtury ambush on Russian forces in Avtury, Chechnya. Videos of the ambushes were made and now circulate the internet.

Alleged links to al-Qaeda

The name of Abu Hafs al-Urduni is often mentioned in connection with Al-Qaeda. Russian intelligence sources and media have repeatedly accused him of being al-Qaeda's emissary in the Caucasus. His name is also found in a presentation of Colin Powell, then U.S. Secretary of State at the Security Council in February 2003 just before the Iraq War, where al-Urduni was stated to be part of a supposed international network headed by Abu Musab al-Zarqawi.

In an interview with Kavkaz Center, al-Urduni once expressed his sympathy with al-Qaeda and Osama bin-Laden, although he did not admit to being part of the organization. On a different occasion he condemned the Beslan hostage crisis and denied personal involvement. Whether or not he was an agent of al-Qaeda or if there are, or have been, any formal ties between the Arab Mujahideen in Chechnya and al-Qaeda remains unclear.

Death
November 26, 2006, Abu Hafs al-Urduni was killed in a gunfight with Russian special forces in Khasav-Yurt, Dagestan. Russian sources claim the fire fight lasted for four hours, and that four other rebels were killed in the encounter. The Kavkaz Center later confirmed al-Urduni's death, but claims only two other rebels were killed in the fighting. December 9, 2006, Qoqaz News, the Chechen Mujahideen online news agency, reported that Muhannad had succeeded al-Urduni as commander of the Arab Mujahideen in Chechnya.

See also
 Abu Omar al-Saif
 Abu Zaid Al-Kuwaiti
 Dagestan War
 Mujahideen in Chechnya

References

External links
 The Jamestown Foundation; ABU HAFS AL-URDANI: THE QUIET MUJAHID
 The Jamestown Foundation’s Chechnya Weekly; The Rise and Fall of Foreign Fighters in Chechnya
 Prague Watchdog; The radicalisation of the Chechen separatist movement: Myth or reality?
 GlobalTerrorAlert; Communiqué from Abu Hafs al-Urdani (Jordan), Commander of the Foreign Mujahideen in Chechnya(PDF)
 Site Institute; Qoqaz News Confirms Death of Chechen Mujahideen Commander Abu Hafs al-Urduni

1973 births
2006 deaths
Foreign volunteers in Chechnya
Islamic terrorism in Russia
Military personnel killed in action
Jordanian Sunni Muslims
Warlords